Seeduwa  (/sīðuvə/; Sinhalese: සීදුව Seeduwa pronounced [sīðuvə]; Tamil: சீதுவை Seeduwai pronounced [Cītuvai]) is a suburb of Negombo, in Katana Divisional Secretariat, Western Province of Sri Lanka. It is located on the A03 road between Colombo and Negombo.

In 2012, Seeduwa had a population of 38,355 with the majority of people either Roman Catholics, Methodists or Buddhists.

Etymology 
There are four theories about the origin of the name "Seeduwa":

Duwa දූව pronounced [ðūvə]) meaning "island" is given to the village as it is surrounded by the river Dandugam Oya (Attanugalu Oya), as well as canals and paddy fields, giving Seeduwa an island-like appearance. The four theories concern the beginning portion "සී" (See-) of the name Seeduwa.
 The name could have derived from Sinha Duwa ("සිංහදූව") pronounced [siṁhə ðūvə] derived from සිංහයන් සිටි = සිංහදූව සීදුව [=island where lions existed] ) due to the belief of past presence of lions in the village. However, there is no evidence of lions existed in Sri Lanka after 37,000 BC, which makes this theory neglectable.
 The name could have derived from Sinha Duwa ("සිංහදූව") pronounced [siṁhə ðūvə] derived from සිංහගේ දූව = සිංහදූව සීදුව [=Sinha's Island] ) because King Bhuwanaikabahu V gave this area to a chief named Sinha.
 The name could have derived from Sivu Dupath ("සිවුදූපත්") pronounced [sivu ðūpaθ] derived from දූපත් සතර = සිවුදූපත්සී දුව [= four islands] ) because there are four areas in Seeduwa (Athul Owita, Maddegoda, Vena and Maharagodalla) which are separated with small canals and paddy fields, creating the appearance of four islands.
 Finally, that it could have derived from Siri Duwa ("සිරිදූව")pronounced [siri ðūvə] derived from සිරිමත් දූව = සිරි දූව සීදුව [= prosperous island] ) because in the past this was a prosperous area.

History 
The first historical evidence of Seeduwa occurs in the era of King Bhuwanekabahu V, when this area was given to a chief named Simha.

As Seeduwa is a village in the coastal area, which has been governed by the Portuguese, Dutch and English during their respective periods of control of the island, thus their influence is significant. Evidence from the Dutch period includes the observation tower at Amandoluwa. In 1890, a Roman Catholic church building was built in Seeduwa, for a congregation which had previously met in a small tent.

With the development occurred after establishment of open economy, this area became very significant as a result of the location in between the Investment Promotion Zone in Katunayake, and Ekala Industrial Estate. Most of the employees started to board in Seeduwa. As a result, Seeduwa got more populated.

Geography 

Seeduwa is bordered from the Dandugam Oya (Aththanugalu Oya) to the South and East, while from the Negombo Lagoon to the West. It is majorly composed of land, marshes and the mangroves.  Dandugam Oya (Aththanagalu Oya), and Dickwela stream, which is a natural stream starting from the river exist as the water bodies running through the village. Marshy fields are found surrounding the canal and the river. Mangrove ecosystems are found in the estuary of Dandugam Oya (Aththanagalu Oya), and along the lining of the lagoon. Most of the water is taken from ground, as per availability of ground water.

Climate 
Seeduwa has a tropical monsoon climate. Temperature of Seeduwa is fairly temperate throughout the year. May and October are the months with maximum precipitation. The yearly average temperature is 29.5 °C (85.1 °F).

Government 
Before 1970, Seeduwa was governed by the Andiambalama Village Council. From 1970 onwards Seeduwa has been governed by the Seeduwa Katunayake Urban Council. Its chairman is elected every five years through local government polls. Following the 2018 local government elections the Sri Lanka Podujana Peramuna hold the majority of the Council seats. Sarath Peiris, a United National Party politician, however was elected as chairman.

Zones 
Seeduwa consists of 6 zones which includes 9 wards of Katunayake Seeduwa Urban Council.
 Seeduwa (/sīðuvə/)
 Seeduwa North
 Seeduwa South
 Amandoluwa (/amanðoluvə/)
 Bandarawaththe (/baṇḍāravaððə/)
 Bandarawaththe West
 Bandarawaththe East
 Ambalammulla (/ambəlammullə/)
 Mookalangamuwa (/mūkəlaṁgəmuvə/)
 Mookalangamuwa West
 Mookalangamuwa East
 Liyanagemulla (/liyənəgēmullə/)
 Liyanagemulla North
 Liyanagemulla South

Economy 
In the 19th century, the economy of Seeduwa was based on coconut and cinnamon production, as well as carpentry, in which the residents were employed in.

After the economical changes happened in Sri Lanka in 1977, a noticeable change of economy happened in this area. Therefore, this area was chosen to the establishment of Investment Promotion Zone, Bandaranayake International Airport (CMB), army camps, State Distilleries Corporation (Currently DCSL) were established in this area. With the establishments of industries under Investment Board, this became a town of national importance.

Ambalammulla area, which is the southernmost, is still famous for its pottery.

Religions 

Before the 17th century, most inhabitants of Seeduwa was Buddhists. An old Sanhida is located under the Banyan tree near the ferry.

In the 17th century, Roman Catholic priests came to the village and many were converted. In 1890, a church was built and dedicated to Immaculata Virgin Mary, replacing a tent the congregation had met in previously.

In 1814, Methodist ministers arrived and established a church, converted a number of people.

During the early 20th century, relations between Catholics and Methodists were strained. In 1946, Methodist leader Rev. Dencil De Silva, who led the Methodist council, opened a youth centre to people of any religion, easing some of the religious tension in the region.  Now all live in peace and harmony.

Present day, the majority is Roman Catholic Population, alongside Buddhists, Methodists, and other Christians.

Places of Religious Importance

Buddhist 
 Sri Sugatharama Temple - Mookalangamuwa
 Suvisuddharama Temple - Liyanagemulla
 Shantharamaya Temple - Mookalangamuwa
 Gangaramaya Temple - Ambalammulla
 Bandarawaththe Bodhiya - Badarawaththe
 Mahawaththe Bodhiya - Mookalangamuwa

Roman Catholic

Seeduwa Parish 
 Church of Immaculata Virgin Mary - Seeduwa
 Church of St. Francis Salis - Amandoluwa
 Church of St. Sebastian - Jayawardanapura
 Church of St. Jude - Kurulukele
 Supuwath Arana - Seeduwa

Bandarawaththe Parish 
 Church of St. Mary - Bandarawaththe

Liyanagemulla Parish 
 Shrine of St. Anthony - Liyanagemulla

Methodist 
 Seeduwa Methodist Church
 Rajapakshapura Methodist Church
 Liyanagemulla Methodist Church
 Maddegoda Methodist Church
 Jayawardanapura Methodist Church

Transportation

Road Transport 
Seeduwa is located on the A3 (Colombo - Negombo Road). The newly constructed E03 (Colombo Katunayake Expressway) runs through the boundaries of Seeduwa.

Bus 
Most of the bus routes which start from Colombo or Ja-Ela and passing or destined to Negombo run through the border of Seeduwa. Other than that some busses run from Raddolugama to Seeduwa and to Awariwaththe (Katunayake). 

Common Bus Routes Via Seeduwa   

Colombo - Point Pedro (87) 

Colombo - Jaffna (87) 

Colombo - Killinochchi (87) 

Colombo - Vavuniya (87) 

Colombo - Mannar (04) 

Colombo - Thalaimannar (04) 

Colombo - Anuradhapura (04) 

Colombo - Puttalam (04) 

Colombo - Anamaduwa (04) 

Colombo - Chilaw (04) 

Colombo - Negambo (240) 

Colombo - Katunayake Airport (187) 

Colombo - Raddolugama (188)

Rail Transport 
The Puttlam railway line runs through Seeduwa. Seeduwa railway station is a railway station where most of the express trains stop. Puttlam line ends its double track from Seeduwa to begin a single track. Currently double track is under construction from Seeduwa. Railway stations in Seeduwa are:

 Seeduwa Railway Station 
 Liyanagemulla Railway Station

Other Transport 
Other than Bandaranayake International Airport, the main seaplane landing port in Sri Lanka has been opened on the shore of Dandugam (Aththanagalu) Oya at Seeduwa, which will be run by Sri Lankan Airlines.

Education 
Schools in Seeduwa are under the Negombo Educational Zone. Following is a list of several of the schools in the area.
 Amandoluwa RCPV
 Amandoluwa MV
 Bandaranayake JSV
 Davisamara MV
 Seeduwa Methodist PV
 Seeduwa RCPV
 Sri Jothirathna V
 St. Mary's PV

Sports 
Seeduwa has the rich traditional history of producing outstanding volleyball players and even schools like Davisamara College, Seeduwa, is far ahead of most of the school that play volleyball. Some recent players are as follows:

Members of Sri Lanka Junior Men's Volleyball team 2017 for 18th Asian Junior Men's (under 21) Volleyball Championships who are from Seeduwa:
 Rehan Madusanka Fernando (Davisamara MV)
 Mihiranga Udayakumara (Davisamara MV)
 Vishmana Chankama (Davisamara MV)
 Chamika Sandaruwan (Davisamara MV)
Members of Asian Youth Volleyball squad for Myanmar tourney 2017 who are from Seeduwa: 
 Dinidu Ruchintha Lakshan Tissera (Davisamara MV)
 Pasindu Sandaruwan (Davisamara MV)
 Dilanka Maduranga (Davisamara MV)
Cricket and Elle are also popular in Seeduwa.

Notable residents

Actors 

 Vijaya Kumaranathunga - actor, politician
 Jeewan Kumarathunga - actor, politician

Musicians 

 Henry Caldera - singer, songwriter, musician
 Ivo Denis - singer

Musical Bands Originated 

 Seeduwa Sakura
 Seeduwa Bravo

See also 

 E03 expressway (Sri Lanka)
 Liyanagemulla

References

Location of Seeduwa 

Populated places in Western Province, Sri Lanka